The 2006 Canadian census was a detailed enumeration of the Canadian population. Census day was May 16, 2006. The following census was the 2011 census. Canada's total population enumerated by the 2006 census was 31,612,897. This count was lower than the official July 1, 2006 population estimate of 32,623,490 people. The previous census was the 2001 census and the following census was in 2011 census.

Summary 
Over 12.7 million households, 32.5 million people were expected to be counted. Canada Post delivered census forms by mail to 70% of the country, primarily residents in urban areas. Census enumerators delivered to the remaining 30% of households. Every fifth home received the long questionnaire (53 questions versus 8 questions on the short form). For the first time, Canadian residents were able to go online to fill in their forms. Statistics Canada expected approximately 20% of households to file their surveys electronically. Persistent census staff are contacting tardy households. The total estimated cost of the 2006 census is $567 million spread over seven years, employing more than 25,000 full and part-time census workers.

New in the 2006 census questionnaire:
 Education. Where did individuals receive their highest level of education? (Only on extended questionnaire)
 Income. Permission to use income information from an individual's income tax file. Income from child benefits. Income tax paid. (Also only on extended questionnaire)
 Access to personal information. Permission to make information public in 92 years.

Questions not asked in the 2006 census:
 Religion. Normally asked only once every 10 years, and the religion question was asked in the 2001 census.
 Education. The number of years of schooling received.

Modified questions 
 Education

Data products 
As the data were compiled, Statistics Canada released various census data products. The first set of data products was released on March 13, 2007, originally scheduled for release on February 13, 2007, covering population and dwelling counts by geographical unit. This was followed by other census data products.

Population and dwelling counts 
The first release of 2006 census data was on March 13, 2007, covering population and dwelling counts by geographical unit.

Population of the provinces and territories

Population and dwellings

Age and sex 
The second release of 2006 census data was on July 17, 2007, covering age and sex of the Canadian population. Among other findings, Statistics Canada reported that the 65-and-over population was at a record high of 13.7% of the total population of Canada. By comparison, the 2001 census found that the 65-and-over population was 13.0% of the total population of Canada.

Population of each province and territory by age and sex

Families, marital status, households and dwelling characteristics 
The third release of 2006 census data was on September 12, 2007 and covered families/households, marital status, and dwelling characteristics.

The following table displays various census data (derived from the 20% sample that completed the long questionnaire) on marital status for the Canadian population aged 15 years or more, as well as data on the number of couples by various criteria, and where available the percentage change from the 2001 census:

Immigration, citizenship, language, mobility and migration 
The fourth release of 2006 census data was on December 4, 2007 and covered immigration, citizenship, language, mobility, migration and other population data.

Aboriginal peoples 
The fifth release of 2006 census data was on January 15, 2008, covering aboriginal peoples.

Labour, place of work/commuting to work, education, language 
The sixth release of 2006 census data was on March 4, 2008, covering labour, education and some other topics going with that.

Ethnic origin, visible minorities 
The seventh release of 2006 census data was on April 2, 2008, covering ethnic origins and visible minorities and commuting to work.

Income/earnings, shelter costs 
The eighth release of 2006 census data was on May 1, 2008, covering income and earnings, and shelter costs.

Advertising 

In contrast to 1996 focus-groups that found it important to know the legal requirement at the outset, participants of 2005 focus-groups were annoyed or provoked by draft ads reminding Canadians about the census law. As a result of the finding, Statistics Canada's initial newspaper, radio and TV ads avoided mention of the legal requirement. Instead, reference to the census law was highlighted only in ads appearing after census day, to capture late filers.

To encourage participation, Statistics Canada set aside $13 million for "saturation" advertising, including billboards, bookmarks, inserts in municipal tax bills, and ads on bags of sugar and milk cartons.

Outsourcing 
Statistics Canada reports less than 20% of the work will be outsourced, spending $85 million over 5 years.  Despite an open public tender process, controversy arose on the announcement of a $43.3 million deal awarded to Lockheed Martin Canada—a subsidiary of Lockheed Martin, the world's largest defense contractor by defense revenue—for the purchase of scanning and printing software and hardware.

Forms 
A variety of forms were available in both official languages, varying in length, colour, and recipient's location.

Most households (80%) received the short form (2A):
 English: orange
 French: yellow

One in five received the long form (2B):
 English: red
 French: purple

Federal and provincial employees and their families working in embassies and National Defence bases abroad (2C):
 English: purple
 French: red

In the three northern territories and on Aboriginal communities and settlements (2D):
 English: orange
 French: yellow

Census of Agriculture (6):
 English: yellow
 French: orange

Controversy 
Special interest groups criticised Statistics Canada over the design of questions, accuracy, and the future of the census data:

 Question 6: Relationship. Couples in same-sex marriages were offended by and/or objected to Statistics Canada's instruction that they use the write-in field "Other" instead of checking the "husband or wife" box.
 Question 16: Mother tongue. An anonymous email misinformation campaign advised bilingual francophones to not mention their knowledge of English.
 Question 53: Election to release census data after 92 years. Genealogists worried that future research will be hampered if Canadians didn't check this box.
Nationally, there was a yes response in respect of 55.58% of persons enumerated in the census. The yes percentage was highest in Prince Edward Island, 64.50%, and lowest in Nunavut, 51.39%. Individual respondents are permitted to change their response to this question by mailing in a request-for-change form.

In addition, Statistics Canada's online questionnaire had been criticized over accessibility issues:

 Failure to comply with Treasury Board, guidelines to meet W3C accessibility recommendations for the visually impaired
 Failure to support open source, operating systems. Support for Linux was eventually added, but support for other operating systems was not.

The quality of data was further hampered by individuals who advocated minimal cooperation or non-cooperation, in protest to the outsourcing contract awarded to Lockheed Martin.  Many people believed that Lockheed Martin would have access to their information, and that the US government could then access that information through the USA PATRIOT Act.  However, despite assurances to the contrary (i.e., only Statistics Canada employees would and could handle, store, and access the information), some people refused to participate fully in the census.

The release of data was postponed to numerous issues during enumeration. These included:
 the recruitment of enumerators amid a competitive job market, particularly in Western Canada
the requirement of some people to fill out a second form after their first forms did not arrive in the mail; and
 delays in payments to enumerators

As a result, the first release of data from the census, originally scheduled for release on February 13, 2007, was delayed to March 13, 2007.

See also 
 2011 Canadian census
 Demographics of Canada
 Statistics Act

External links 
2006 Census by topics and regions - Statistics Canada's page on the 2006 census
Census 2006 - 2A (Short Form) 
Census 2006 - 2B (Long Form)

References 

Census
Censuses in Canada
2006 censuses